is a Japanese professional footballer who plays as a forward for Renofa Yamaguchi FC on loan from Matsumoto Yamaga FC.

References

External links

1998 births
Living people
Japanese footballers
Japan youth international footballers
Association football forwards
Matsumoto Yamaga FC players
Zweigen Kanazawa players
Renofa Yamaguchi FC players
J2 League players